Miroslav Gregáň (born 26 April 1996) is a Slovak footballer who currently plays for Sitno Banská Štiavnica, competing in 5. Liga, as a midfielder.

Club career

FK Teplice
He made his professional debut for Teplice against Příbram on 13 February 2016.

References

External links
 FK Teplice official profile
 Eurofotbal profile
 Futbalnet profile
 
 Miroslav Gregáň at MFK Dukla

1996 births
Living people
Slovak footballers
Slovak expatriate footballers
Slovakia under-21 international footballers
Association football midfielders
FK Pohronie players
FK Teplice players
TJ Valašské Meziříčí players
MFK Lokomotíva Zvolen players
ŠKM Liptovský Hrádok players
FK Dukla Banská Bystrica players
FK Sitno Banská Štiavnica players
2. Liga (Slovakia) players
3. Liga (Slovakia) players
Czech First League players
Austrian 2. Landesliga players
5. Liga players
Slovak expatriate sportspeople in the Czech Republic
Expatriate footballers in the Czech Republic
Slovak expatriate sportspeople in Austria
Expatriate footballers in Austria